SS-11 may refer to:

 SS.11, a French anti-tank missile
 SS-11 Sego, a Soviet intercontinental ballistic missile
 Raketenjagdpanzer SS-11, a German tank destroyer
 Freedom Lite SS-11 Skywatch, an ultralight aircraft
 , a submarine of the United States Navy